Tibor Molnár (26 July 1921 – 24 November 1982) was a Hungarian film actor. He appeared in more than 90 films between 1948 and 1982.

Selected filmography

 Tüz (1948)
 Treasured Earth (1948) - Tarcali Jani
 Szabóné (1949)
 Lúdas Matyi (1950)
 Úri muri (1950)
 Becsület és dicsöség (1951) - Bikov, szovjet sztahanovista
 Déryné (1951) - Katona József
 Ütközet békében (1952) - Széki
 Vihar (1952) - Göndöcs Gyula párttitkár
 Semmelweis (1952) - Hamerlin
 Állami áruház (1953)
 Föltámadott a tenger (1953) - Irinyi
 A harag napja (1953) - Bognár
 Kiskrajcár (1953) - Kubikus
 Rokonok (1954)
 Simon Menyhért születése (1954)
 Budapesti tavasz (1955) - Gazsó Bertalan
 Különös ismertetöjel (1955) - Busa János
 A 9-es kórterem (1955) - Tóth Gáspár
 Szakadék (1956) - Bakos Ferenc
 Ünnepi vacsora (1956) - Tuba Sanyi
 Mese a 12 találatról (1957)
 Two Confessions (1957)
 A császár parancsára (1957) - Mihály
 Quelqu'un frappe à la porte (1958) - Alexandre
 Refuge England (1959, Short)
 Megöltek egy lányt (1961) - Marci
 Two Half Times in Hell (1961) - Rácz
 Megszállottak (1962) - Fõigazgató
 Májusi fagy (1962)
 Pesti háztetök (1962) - Csurik
 Lopott boldogság (1962) - Szirák, Sándor
 Angyalok földje (1962) - Imre bácsi
 Isten öszi csillaga (1963)
 Bálvány (1963) - Drahos
 Párbeszéd (1963) - Králik Géza
 Fotó Háber (1963)
 Egy ember, aki nincs (1964) - Zámbó
 Karambol (1964) - Edzõ
 Miért rosszak a magyar filmek? (1964) - Tokodi
 Váltás (1964)
 My Way Home (1965) - Hazatérõ férfi
 Twenty Hours (1965) - Máthé
 Déltöl hajnalig (1965) - Balla János
 A köszívü ember fiai (1965) - Magyar tábornok
 A Tenkes kapitánya (1965) - Siklósi
 The Round-Up (1965) - Kabai
 Fény a redöny mögött (1966) - Teherautósofõr
 Szentjános fejevétele (1966) - Tsz-elnök
 Hideg napok (1966) - Börtönparancsnok
 Nem szoktam hazudni (1966) - Rendõr
 Édes és keserü (1967) - Rendõ
 Utószezon (1967) - Aranyozó
 Sellö a pecsétgyürün (1967, part 1, 2) - Busa
 Ten Thousand Days (1967) - Széles István
 The Red and the White (1967) - Andras
 A völgy (1968) - Tibor
 A holtak visszajárnak (1968) - Solti
 Az utolsó kör (1968) - Sanyi Apja
 Stars of Eger (1968) - Márton pap
 The Upthrown Stone (1969) - Kerék András
 Az örökös (1969) - Mûvezetõ
 Szemüvegesek (1969) - Szántó
 Szemtöl szembe (1970) - Szlovák partizán
 Arc (1970) - Andi szomszédja
 Mérsékelt égöv (1970) - Kovács István
 Gyula vitéz télen-nyáron (1970) - Lajos
 Én vagyok Jeromos (1971) - A bányász
 Red Psalm (1972) - Lovas Imre, szocialista
 Harminckét nevem volt (1972)
 Romantika (1972) - Egy paraszt
 A locsolókocsi (1974) - Mihálik
 Tüzgömbök (1975) - Zách József
 Ha megjön József (1976) - Dávid, Ágnes volt férje
 Árvácska (1976) - Egy férfi
 Man Without a Name (1976) - Péter bácsi
 A királylány zsámolya (1976) - Szénégetõ
 A csillagszemü (1977) - Molnár
 Hungarians (1978) - Gáspár Dániel
 A közös bün (1978) - Stibor
 A ménesgazda (1978)
 Kinek a törvénye? (1979) - Antal Samu
 Kojak Budapesten (1980)
 Forbidden Relations (1983) - Pista bácsi
 Keserü igazság (1986) - Bónis

External links

1921 births
1982 deaths
Hungarian male film actors
20th-century Hungarian male actors